The development of academic libraries in Nigeria can be traced back to pre-independence period when the University of Ibadan and its library were established in 1948. Academic libraries are set up to support learning, teaching and research in tertiary institutions. They also feature prominently in curriculum development of the various departments of their parent institutions. Academic libraries can be categorised mainly into: university, polytechnics, colleges of education and school of nursing libraries.

University libraries 
In Nigeria, there are 43 libraries established in federal universities, 48 libraries founded in state owned universities and 79 libraries founded in private universities.

The list of university libraries in Nigeria are:

Federal universities

State universities

Private universities

Polytechnic libraries 
Polytechnic libraries are established with the primary goal of providing information resources to students, members of staff of the polytechnic community and other intended users. Apart from the information materials, personal assistance is offered to library users to ensure optimal use of the library. There are 29 Federal Polytechnic Libraries in 29 Federal Polytechnics in Nigeria, 48 State owned polytechnic libraries and 57 privately owned polytechnic libraries in Nigeria.

List of Polytechnic Libraries in Nigeria

See also 
Academic libraries by country
Federal University of Technology Owerri (FUTO) Library
Samuel Adegboyega University Library
Covenant University Library (Centre for Learning Resources)
Olusegun Oke Library

References

Nigeria academic
Libraries academic
Libraries